S.A.-Mann Brand (Storm Trooper Brand) is a German film made around the time that Adolf Hitler became Chancellor of Germany. It was released in mid-June 1933.

The film presents the story of a truck driver, Fritz Brand, who joins the Nazi Sturmabteilung to defend Germany against communist subversion orchestrated from Moscow. He persuades his social circle of the imminent danger and the need to support Hitler in the federal election.

A review in The New York Times noted favorably the film's production value and the absence of any anti-Semitic message but also expressed contempt for its unsophisticated plot.

Cast
Heinz Klingenberg as Fritz Brand
Wera Liessem as Anni Baumann
Rolf Wenkhaus as Erich Lohner
Hedda Lembach as Margaret Lohner
Otto Wernicke as Herr Brand
Elise Aulinger as Frau Brand
Joe Stöckel as Anton Huber
Helma Rückert as Genoveva Huber
Max Weydner as Alexandr Turow
Philipp Weichand as SA-Wirt
Fritz Greiner as Herr Baumann
Magda Lena as Frau Baumann
Rudolf Frank as Neuberg
Manfred Koempel as Pilot, himself
Theo Kaspar as himself
Wastl Witt as Wirt "Café Diana"
Rudolf Kunig as Stadtrat Rolat
Josef Eichheim as unknown

See also 
List of German films 1919-1933
List of German films 1933-1945
Nazism and cinema

References

External links 
 
 
 

1933 films
Films of Nazi Germany
1930s German-language films
Nazi propaganda films
German black-and-white films
1933 drama films
German drama films
1930s German films